Baliochila abri is a butterfly in the family Lycaenidae. It is found in central Tanzania. Its habitat consists of moist montane forests.

Adults have been recorded on wing in February and March.

Etymology
The species is named for the African Butterfly Research Institute in Nairobi, Kenya.

References

Butterflies described in 2004
Poritiinae
Endemic fauna of Tanzania
Butterflies of Africa